Abdul Aziz bin Haji Tamit (born 7 September 1989) is a Bruneian footballer who plays for Kasuka FC as a defender.

Club career
Abdul Aziz played for Brunei DPMM FC from 2009, when the club joined the S.League of Singapore after leaving the Malaysia Super League, until the end of 2016. His debut came in a 2–0 defeat to Home United on 10 May 2009. He went on loan to Indera SC and AM Gunners for the duration of the two-year FIFA suspension of Brunei.

Returning to DPMM in 2012, Abdul Aziz was greatly involved with the first-team in DPMM's 2013 campaign and also in 2014, but could not displace either Brian McLean or Boris Raspudić in 2015. After the latter's exit due to a reduction in the league's quota of foreign imports in 2016, he was back in contention for a starting place in the DPMM backline. Nevertheless he only appeared in 6 games and was released at the end of the season.

Abdul Aziz joined Kasuka FC in 2017, where he was reunited with Sairol Sahari who is currently assistant coach for the club. He scored his first goal against Wijaya FC on 19 May.

After an impressive 2017 season with four goals from the back, Abdul Aziz was re-signed by DPMM FC in 2018. A stellar pre-season convinced new coach Renê Weber to place him as a starter, and he duly replied with a goal in his first game back at the club, which was a 4–2 win over Home United FC on 7 April. Abdul Aziz made 20 appearances under Weber as DPMM finished third in the league.

After failing to make an appearance in the 2019 season, Abdul Aziz was deregistered to make way for the returning Adi Said. However he was re-registered in the following campaign, taking back the number 21 shirt from the departed Adi.

In early 2023, Abdul Aziz transferred to Kasuka FC.

International career

Abdul Aziz appeared once for the Brunei under-21s at the 2007 Hassanal Bolkiah Trophy, which was a 3-1 defeat to Myanmar. His international debut came at the 2014 AFF Suzuki Cup qualifiers when the majority of the national side was represented by his club DPMM. Against Timor-Leste on 12 October, he played the full 90 minutes in a 4–2 loss.

Honours
DPMM FC
 S.League: 2015
 Singapore League Cup (3): 2009, 2012, 2014
 Brunei FA Cup: 2022

References

External links
 
 

1989 births
Living people
Association football defenders
Bruneian footballers
Brunei international footballers
DPMM FC players
Indera SC players